Pinheads and Patriots: Where You Stand in the Age of Obama is a book by American journalist Bill O'Reilly, published in 2010.

Content 
The premise of Pinheads & Patriots is taken from a segment on O’Reilly’s talk show, “The Factor,” during which he called out people who do good things (patriots) or bad things (pinheads).  In the book, O’Reilly tries to be more precise about these terms.  He defines a pinhead as someone who lacks intelligence or common sense.  The term applies to individual actions, but O’Reilly warns that “Pinhead status is a slippery slope.  Get in with the wrong crowd, get taken by your own success, or get some bad advice, and all of that can lead to residence in Pinheadville.”  By way of contrast, “Patriotism is not short, frenzied outbursts of emotion, but the tranquil and steady dedication of a lifetime.”

Resurgence and Internet Meme Status 
The book has seen a considerable rise in popularity starting in July 2020 when paleoconservative streamer Nick Fuentes mentioned it during the superchat segment of his show America First, a political commentary show he hosts on weeknights.  Since then, the book has been subject to ridicule and the terminology has been used to mock neoconservatives like O'Reilly. Supreme Court Justice Neil Gorsuch has also been targeted by the meme, with Fuentes stating, "We needed a patriot but got a pinhead.”

External links 
Book on O'Reilly's Official Website

2010 non-fiction books
Books about politics of the United States
Books by Bill O'Reilly (political commentator)
William Morrow and Company books